Vanishree or Vanishri is an Indian actress known for her work in Kannada cinema and television. Some of the notable films of Vanishree as an actress include Sparsha (2000), Gaalipata (2008), Nan Hendthi Chennagidale (2000) and Chowka (2017).

Career
Vanishree has been part of more than ninety films and many Television serials and Shows in Kannada including Bigg Boss (Season 4).

Selected filmography
 Nammoora Ramayana (1991)
 Elukoti Marthanda Bhairava (1991)
 Bharjari Gandu (1992)
 Ranjitha (1993)
 Om (1995)
 Thavarina Theru (1997)
 Hendithghelthini (1998) 
 Swasthik (1999)
 Shrirasthu Shubhamasthu (2000)
 Sparsha (2000)...Mangala
 Mahalakshmi (2001)
 Meera Madhava Raghava (2007)
 Beladingalagi Baa (2008)
 Gaalipata (2008)...Ganesh's sister
 Mussanjeya Gelathi (2009)
 Lodde (2015)
 Abhinethri (2015)
 Chowka (2017)
 Chakravarthy (2017)
 Tiger (2017)
 Chamak (2017)
 Orange...Dr. Sudha
 French Biriyani (2020) as Mahadev's wife

Television

See also

List of people from Karnataka
List of Indian film actresses

References

External links
 

Actresses in Kannada cinema
Living people
Kannada people
Actresses from Karnataka
Actresses from Bangalore
Indian film actresses
21st-century Indian actresses
Actresses in Kannada television
Year of birth missing (living people)
Bigg Boss Kannada contestants